Clathrella may refer to:
 Clathrella (protist), a genus of protists in the family Clathrellidae
 Clathrella, a genus of gastropods in the family Amathinidae, synonym of Carinorbis
 Clathrella, a genus of fungi in the family Phallaceae, synonym of Clathrus